Sanyathara is an Indian actress, who has appeared in Tamil films.

Career
She gave herself the screen name of Sanyathara, reportedly because she was a fan of tennis player Sania Mirza and actress Nayantara, and felt that the name would bring her luck.

She starred alongside newcomers in Oruvar Meethu Iruvar Sainthu, Panivizhum Malarvanam, and Adhu Vera Idhu Vera  and with Vijay Vasanth in Nandha Periyasamy's Jigina.

Sanyathara has finished filming for Vaaraayo Vennilaave and Kadai Enn 6, both directed by Sasidharan, and Thagadu Thagadu starring lyricist Pa. Vijay.

Filmography

References

External links
 

Indian film actresses
Actresses in Tamil cinema
Living people
Year of birth missing (living people)
21st-century Indian actresses